Darden is an unincorporated community and census-designated place (CDP) in Henderson County, Tennessee, United States. As of the 2010 census, its population was 399. The ZIP code is 38328.

Demographics

Notes

Census-designated places in Henderson County, Tennessee
Unincorporated communities in Tennessee
Census-designated places in Tennessee
Unincorporated communities in Henderson County, Tennessee